is a professional Japanese baseball player. He is an outfielder for the Chunichi Dragons of Nippon Professional Baseball (NPB).

References 

1999 births
Living people
Baseball people from Aichi Prefecture
Komazawa University alumni
Nippon Professional Baseball outfielders
Chunichi Dragons players